Algis Oleknavicius (born 17 August 1947) is a German former cyclist. He competed for West Germany in the team time trial at the 1972 Summer Olympics.

References

External links
 

1947 births
Living people
German male cyclists
Olympic cyclists of West Germany
Cyclists at the 1972 Summer Olympics
People from Kirchheim unter Teck
Sportspeople from Stuttgart (region)
Cyclists from Baden-Württemberg